The 2003 CAF Super Cup was the 11th CAF Super Cup, an annual football match in Africa organized by the Confederation of African Football (CAF), between the winners of the previous season's two CAF club competitions, the African Cup of Champions Clubs and the African Cup Winners' Cup.

The match took place on 7 February 2003, on Cairo Stadium in Cairo, Egypt, between Zamalek, the 2002 CAF Champions League winner, and Wydad AC, the 2002 African Cup Winners' Cup winner.
Zamalek won the match 3–1 to retain the trophy, as the first team to win the tournament for three times.

Teams

Match details

References
 http://www.angelfire.com/ak/EgyptianSports/ZamalekInAfrSuper.html#2003
 http://www.footballdatabase.eu/football.coupe.zamalek.wydad-casablanca.107280.en.html

2003
Super
2002–03 in Egyptian football
Zamalek SC matches
Wydad AC matches